This is a list of ministries of Greece. Greece is a country in Southern Europe, politically considered part of Western Europe. Greece is a parliamentary republic. Executive power is exercised by the President of the Republic and the Government. Legislative powers are exercised by a 300-member elective unicameral Parliament.

Ministry of Rural Development and Food
Ministry of Justice, Transparency and Human Rights
Ministry of Administrative Reform and Electronic Governance
Ministry of National Defense
Ministry of Foreign Affairs
Ministry of the State
Ministry of Labour and Social Affairs
Ministry of Interior
Ministry of Finance
Ministry of Education, Lifelong Learning and Religious Affairs
Ministry for the Environment, Physical Planning and Public Works
Ministry of Regional Development and Competitiveness
Ministry of Culture and Sports
Ministry for the Protection of the Citizen
Ministry of Health and Welfare
Ministry of Development
Ministry of Infrastructure, Transport and Networks
Ministry of Maritime Affairs, Islands and Fisheries
Ministry of Tourism

See also
Foreign relations of Greece

Lists of government ministers of Greece
Lists of government ministries